In Greek mythology, Cleopatra (Ancient Greek: Κλεοπάτρα Kleopatra means "glory of the father") was the name of the following women:

 Cleopatra (Danaid), daughter of Danaus.
Cleopatra, daughter of King Tros of Troy and Callirhoe, daughter of the river-god Scamander. She was the sister of Ilus, Assaracus, Ganymede and possibly, Cleomestra. Cleopatra and Cleomestra probably refer to the same individual.
Cleopatra, daughter of Boreas (North wind) and the Athenian princess, Oreithyia. She was the first wife of Phineus by whom he had a pair of sons, named either Plexippus and Pandion, or Gerymbas and Aspondus, or Polydector (Polydectus) and Polydorus, or Parthenius and Crambis, or  Oryithus (Oarthus) and Crambis.
Cleopatra Alcyone, wife of Meleager.
Cleopatra, wife of King Deucalion of Crete and mother of Idomeneus.
 Cleopatra and Periboea of Locris, two maidens sent to the Trojan temple of Athena in retribution for Ajax the Lesser's sacrilege. This was done because three years after the Locrians had regained their country, they suffered a plague. Then an oracle bade them to propitiate Athena at Troy, sending two maidens as suppliants for a thousand years. The first lot fell on Periboea and Cleopatra, and after their deaths others were sent.

Notes

References 

 Apollodorus, The Library with an English Translation by Sir James George Frazer, F.B.A., F.R.S. in 2 Volumes, Cambridge, MA, Harvard University Press; London, William Heinemann Ltd. 1921. ISBN 0-674-99135-4. Online version at the Perseus Digital Library. Greek text available from the same website.
Dictys Cretensis, from The Trojan War. The Chronicles of Dictys of Crete and Dares the Phrygian translated by Richard McIlwaine Frazer, Jr. (1931-). Indiana University Press. 1966. Online version at the Topos Text Project.
 .
 Homer, The Iliad with an English Translation by A.T. Murray, Ph.D. in two volumes. Cambridge, MA., Harvard University Press; London, William Heinemann, Ltd. 1924. . Online version at the Perseus Digital Library.
Homer, Homeri Opera in five volumes. Oxford, Oxford University Press. 1920. . Greek text available at the Perseus Digital Library.

Women in Greek mythology
Cretan characters in Greek mythology
Thracian characters in Greek mythology